The  was an electric multiple unit (EMU) train type operated by Kintetsu Railway in Japan.

Formation
The train was formed as a four-car set. It was formerly able to run in a three-car formation, but was converted to a fixed four-car formation in 1991, and the cab equipment was removed from the intermediate car.

History
The set was built in 1979 as a chopper control evaluation train, and was withdrawn in 2012. The cab end of car Ku 3501 is preserved at Takayasu Inspection Depot.

References

External links

 Kintetsu official website 

Electric multiple units of Japan
3000 series

1500 V DC multiple units of Japan
Kinki Sharyo multiple units